Kynnersley is a civil parish in the district of Telford and Wrekin, Shropshire, England.  It contains three listed buildings that are recorded in the National Heritage List for England.  Of these, one is at Grade II*, the middle of the three grades, and the others are at Grade II, the lowest grade.  The parish contains the village of Kynnersley and the surrounding countryside.  All the listed buildings are in the centre of the village, and consist of a medieval church, a timber framed cottage, and a brick house.


Key

Buildings

References

Citations

Sources

Lists of buildings and structures in Shropshire